The national team of Croatia has competed in the FIFA World Cup six times, finishing on podium on three occasions. Since gaining independence in 1991, Croatia has appeared in and qualified for the 1998, 2002, 2006, 2014, 2018 and 2022 editions of the tournament. Croatia's best result since gaining admission into FIFA in 1992, was securing second place against France in the 2018 World Cup Final, where they lost 4–2. The national side has collected three World Cup medals, two bronze (1998, 2022) and one silver (2018). Due to its small geography and populace, Croatia is often one of the smallest countries competing in the tournament. They are second-smallest country by population (after Uruguay) and land mass (after the Netherlands) to reach a World Cup Final. 

The World Cup is an international association football competition contested by the men's national teams of the members of FIFA, the sport's global governing body. The championship has been awarded every four years since the first tournament in 1930, except in 1942 and 1946, due to World War II. The tournament consists of two parts, the three-year qualification phase and the one-month final phase. The current format involves 32 teams competing for the title, at venues within the host nation (or nations) over a period of about a month. It is the most widely viewed sporting event in the world, with an estimated 1 billion people watching.

Overview

Croatia in France 1998

In the draw for the final tournament, held on 4 December 1997 at Stade Vélodrome in Marseille, Croatia was drawn to play in Group H, along with two other teams which qualified for the World Cup for the first time, Jamaica and Japan, and two-time World Cup winners Argentina. In their first match Croatia beat Jamaica 3–1, in a game memorable for Croatia's first ever World Cup goal, an opener scored by Mario Stanić in the 27th minute. Croatia went on to beat Japan 1–0 before losing their third group stage match against Argentina 0–1, in a game which was of little importance as both teams had already qualified for the round of 16.

In round of 16, Croatia faced Group G winners Romania (who had finished top of their group in front of England) and won the game through a penalty converted by Davor Šuker in stoppage time of the first half after a foul on Aljoša Asanović by Gabriel Popescu. After that Croatia faced Germany in the quarter-finals, in a game which was at the time touted by the Croatian media as a great opportunity to get back at Germany as it was them who had knocked out Croatia in the UEFA Euro 1996 quarter-finals two years earlier. In the 40th minute Christian Wörns received a direct red card and was sent off for fouling Davor Šuker, and Robert Jarni opened the scoring eight minutes later in stoppage time of the first half. Goran Vlaović and Davor Šuker added a second and third and the game ended in a 3–0 win, which is still regarded by fans and the media as one of the most memorable matches Croatia ever played.

Croatia went on to face hosts France in the semi-finals, but lost the game 1–2 when an opener scored by Šuker in the 46th minute was immediately equalised by Lilian Thuram the following minute. Thuram also scored France's second goal in the 69th minute. These were the only two goals Thuram ever scored for France in an international career spanning from 1994 to 2008 which saw him earn a total of 147 caps. After Croatia's exit manager Blažević was heavily criticized by Croatian press for not sending in Robert Prosinečki soon enough after France took the lead (Prosinečki came on as a substitute for Mario Stanić just minutes before the final whistle). Croatia captain Zvonimir Boban tried to take the blame for the defeat saying that he felt he needed to be substituted but wanted to stay on the pitch just a little while longer (it was his defending mistake which led to Thuram's equaliser).

After being knocked out in the semi-finals, Croatia looked for consolation against Netherlands in the third place match played just three days later at Parc des Princes. Croatia went on to win 2–1 through goals by Šuker and Prosinečki, but after the final whistle Dražen Ladić was labelled player of the match, for a career-best performance which saw him save numerous shots from Patrick Kluivert, Clarence Seedorf and Marc Overmars.

Squad

Manager Miroslav Blažević included the following 22 players in the finals tournament squad. The 16 players who were capped at least once in one of the seven matches Croatia played in France are highlighted in bold. The remaining six players were unused at the tournament (defenders Goran Jurić and Anthony Šerić, defensive midfielder Mamić, striker Ardian Kozniku, and second and third-choice goalkeepers Marijan Mrmić and Vladimir Vasilj). On the other hand, six players appeared in all seven matches: goalkeeper Dražen Ladić, defender Slaven Bilić, midfielders Aljoša Asanović, Mario Stanić, Robert Jarni, and striker Davor Šuker.

Out of 11 goals scored by Croatia at the tournament, six were scored by Davor Šuker, who was awarded the Golden Shoe Award for the top goalscorer of the tournament, as well as the Silver Ball Award as the second most outstanding player of the tournament (behind Ronaldo of Brazil). Robert Prosinečki (who was retroactively given the 1990 FIFA World Cup Best Young Player Award, where he had appeared for Yugoslavia), also scored two goals in matches against Jamaica and the Netherlands, which made him the only player in World Cup history to score goals at finals tournaments for two different countries.

For three players (Jarni, Prosinečki and Šuker) this was their second appearance at the World Cup, having been members of Yugoslavia squad at the 1990 FIFA World Cup. Alen Bokšić would have been fourth, having been a key player in Croatia's qualifying campaign, but he was dropped from the tournament squad after sustaining an injury just months before the tournament in France.

Group stage

Knockout stage

Round of 16

Quarter-finals

Semi-finals

Third-place match

Legacy
By beating Netherlands, Croatia finished third in their World Cup debut, a feat matched only by Eusébio's Portugal in the 1966 World Cup 32 years earlier. Consequently, Croatia reached their highest ever FIFA ranking when they were third in the world for three months between January and March 1999 and were given the Best Mover of the Year Award in 1998, the only team so far which won the award twice (having been Best Movers in 1994). Upon returning to Croatia, the whole squad was decorated by President Franjo Tuđman, and were nicknamed "Brončani" ("The Bronze Ones") and "Vatreni'" ("The Fiery Ones") in the media. The latter stuck as a permanent nickname for the national team.

Most players continued playing for the team throughout the UEFA Euro 2000 qualifiers, but after Croatia failed to qualify manager Miroslav Blažević resigned and soon after that some of the players retired from the national team. The next manager Mirko Jozić kept some of the remaining members of the Bronze Generation and even took them to 2002 FIFA World Cup (such as Šuker, Prosinečki, Jarni, Stanić, Soldo, Vlaović, Šimić), but they failed to make an impact at the tournament and almost all of them retired soon afterwards, but a number of them later became prominent figures in Croatian football.

Zvonimir Boban went into sports publishing and took over as CEO of Croatia's sports daily Sportske novosti in 2005 and worked as a commentator for Italian television stations. Šuker launched his line of sports apparel and established a football academy carrying his name. Zvonimir Soldo, Robert Jarni, Slaven Bilić, Igor Štimac and Dražen Ladić all took up managing jobs (Soldo coached Dinamo Zagreb to a Double in 2008, while Jarni, Bilić and Štimac all had managerial spells at Hajduk Split). Štimac later became chairman of the association of Prva HNL clubs, the body regulating top flight football in Croatia, and Bilić took over as Croatia manager in 2006, hiring Aljoša Asanović, Robert Prosinečki and Marijan Mrmić as his assistants. Dražen Ladić took up managing the Croatia under-21 team in 2006, and Krunoslav Jurčić is the current manager at Dinamo Zagreb, having been appointed in 2009. Miroslav Blažević later managed a number of clubs in Croatia, Slovenia and Switzerland before taking over as Bosnia and Herzegovina manager in 2008 and sensationally leading them to the verge of qualifying for the 2010 World Cup.

Croatia in South Korea/Japan 2002
Croatia qualified for their second world cup after navigating Group 6 of UEFA's World Cup qualifications without a loss, finishing first and directly qualifying ahead of Belgium, Scotland, Latvia and San Marino.

Croatia qualification led by manager Miroslav Blažević, but after tying the initial two matches, he was replaced by Mirko Jozić, who would manage the team during the World Cup.

Despite defeating Italy in the second game of the group stage, Croatia, needing a win against Ecuador confirm qualification for the knockout stages, could not break down the Ecuadorian defense, and only solid goalkeeping from Stipe Pletikosa prevented the South Americans from winning by a greater scoreline. A late Italy goal meant a draw would not send Croatia through, requiring two goals in three minutes to advance, but the Vatreni did not score and exited the competition at the group stage for the first time.

Squad

Group stage

Croatia in Germany 2006
Croatia qualified automatically for the World Cup after topping their qualification group without losing a game, ahead of Sweden, who tied on points and had a better goal difference but who Croatia had defeated twice. Future superstar Luka Modrić made the final World Cup squad in spite of not playing in a single qualification match.

Croatia selected Bad Brückenau in northern Bavaria as their training base. The team played four warm-up matches in preparation for the World Cup, defeating Austria in Vienna 4–1, drawing Iran in Osijek 2–2, before losing to Poland and Spain in friendlies in Germany and Switzerland, respectively.

A pitch incident marred Croatia's opening game against Brazil, a 1–0 loss, when a Croatian fan ran onto the pitch near Dado Pršo. Security also confiscated 823 flares, but two flares were successfully lit in the Croatian supporters' section.

After a scoreless draw with Japan, Croatia entered their final match against Australia needing a win to advance. Darijo Srna scored the opener after two minutes and Croatia immediately began playing defensively to protect their lead, allowing the Australians to pressure for the rest of the first half until Craig Moore converted a penalty in the 38th minute after a Stjepan Tomas handball. A defensive error by Australian keeper Kalac led to Niko Kovač putting Croatia up again in the 58th, but this led to Australia pressing again with Harry Kewell equalising with eleven minutes left. The final part of the game was marred by a second yellow card shown to Josip Šimunić without him getting sent off by referee Graham Poll - Šimunić would eventually receive his sending off after a "third" yellow card in the game's final moments.

Squad

Group stage

Croatia in Brazil 2014

Squad

Group stage

Croatia in Russia 2018

Squad

Group stage

Knockout stage

Round of 16

Quarter-finals

Semi-finals

Final

Croatia in Qatar 2022

Squad

Group stage

Knockout stage

Round of 16

Quarter-finals

Semi-finals

Third-place match

List of matches

By opponent

Players with most appearances

Luka Modrić is the only Croatian player to ever win the Golden Ball award. He was team captain in 2018, when Croatia reached the World Cup final.

*Robert Jarni also played one match at the 1990 World Cup, representing SFR Yugoslavia.

Top goalscorers

*Robert Prosinečki also scored one goal at the 1990 World Cup, representing SFR Yugoslavia.

Awards

Team Awards
 Runners-up: 2018
 Third place: 1998, 2022

Individual Awards
 Golden Ball: Luka Modrić (2018)
 Silver Ball: Davor Šuker (1998)
 Bronze Ball: Luka Modrić (2022)
 Golden Boot: Davor Šuker (1998)
 All-Star Team: Davor Šuker (1998), Luka Modrić (2018)

See also
Croatia in the UEFA Nations League
Croatia at the UEFA European Championship
 List of Croatia international footballers

References

 
Countries at the FIFA World Cup